Diamonds & Studs is the second studio album by Morningwood. It was released on October 27, 2009. It was the band's last album.

"Best of Me" was used as the theme song to Daisy of Love.

Critical reception
AllMusic wrote that "while Diamonds & Studs may be a forgettable pop record, it's certainly one that's easy on the ears and hard on dancefloors." Spin wrote that "though these high-energy, guitar-heavy tracks sound like desperate jumps onto bandwagons that left the station long ago ('Killer Life' resembles a No Doubt/Kelly Clarkson collaboration), they’re at least sporadically sticky."

Track listing

Personnel
Chantal Claret - vocals

References

2009 albums
Morningwood albums